Truncus may refer to:

Anatomy
Persistent truncus arteriosus, a rare congenital heart disease
Truncus arteriosus (embryology), part of an embryo's developing circulatory system
A pulmonary artery (truncus pulmonalis)
Lumbosacral trunk (truncus lumbosacralis)
Costocervical trunk (truncus  costocervicalis)
Sympathetic trunk (truncus Sympaticus)
Celiac artery (truncus coeliacus)
Brachiocephalic artery (truncus  brachiocephalicus)
Trunk (anatomy) (truncus)

Other
Truncus (mathematics), a particular algebraic curve